Nomreh Yek-e Pain (also Romanized as Nomreh Yek-e Pā’īn; also known as Āyatollāh Montaz̧erī, Āyatollāh Montaz̧erī-ye Pā’īn, and Nomreh Do) is a village in Chah Salem Rural District, in the Central District of Omidiyeh County, Khuzestan Province, Iran. At the 2006 census, its population was 1,043, in 234 families.

References 

Populated places in Omidiyeh County